Sadashiv Vaman Marathe (1942 – 27 November 2010) was an Indian politician and social worker from Goa. He was a former member of the Goa Legislative Assembly, representing the Sanguem Assembly constituency from 1977 to 1980.

Early and personal life
Sadashiv Vaman Marathe was born at Dharbandora in Sanguem taluka (now Dharbandora taluka). He was married to Vasanti Tamhankar, an agriculturist. Marathe had a special interest in agriculture and hunting being one of his hobbies. He resided at Dharbandora, Goa.

Death
Marathe died on 27 November 2010. He was one of the few prominent people that were made obituary references and was given tributes by the then legislators of the Goa Legislative Assembly.

Positions held
 Chairman of Service Society of Dharbandora 
 Member of Dharbandora Panchayat from 1967
 Secretary of Sarvodaya Education Society Usgaon
  Vice-Chairman of Bhausaheb Bandodkar Shikshan Prasarak Sanstha, Dharbandora
 Vice Chairman Vijaya Dugdh Sahakari Society, Dharbandora 
 Member of Block advisory Committee Sanguem
 Chairman of Sanguem Taluka Krida Samiti
 Member of Committee on Delegated Legislation 1977–78
 Member of Library Committee 1977–78
 Member of Estimates Committee 1977–78

Bibliography
 Shree Akkalakotnivasi Swamimaharaj Yanche Sachitra va Sagra Charitra (Marathi)

References

1942 births
2010 deaths
People from South Goa district
Goan people
20th-century Indian politicians
Indian politicians
Goa MLAs 1977–1980
Maharashtrawadi Gomantak Party politicians
Social workers from Goa
Indian hunters
Indian social workers